Cranston High School East, often called East, Cranston East, or abbreviated as CHSE, is a comprehensive high school located in the central part of Cranston, Rhode Island, with over 1,500 students in grades 9-12 and 150+ faculty members. The school mascot is the Thunderbolt, and its colors are green and white.

Cranston High School East is housed in two buildings, the main building at 899 Park Avenue and the William A. Briggs Building located at 845 Park Avenue, which is where the school was originally housed.  The Briggs building is home to the administrative offices of Cranston Public Schools and also served as a Junior High School in the early part of the 20th century.

Cranston East was the first high school in Cranston; before Cranston West opened in 1958, the school was called simply Cranston High.

Facilities
In the late 19th century, Cranston High School was built and dedicated to William Briggs. In the 1920s a new section of the building (commonly referred to as "main") had been built because Briggs was too crowded at the time due to it being the only high school in the city. In 2007, the southeastern section of the building was rebuilt and added a few more (and much needed) classrooms in the area.  It is commonly referred to as the "new wing."

Notable alumni 

 Bill Bennett, former ice hockey left winger
 Curt Bennett, former professional ice hockey forward
 Harvey Bennett Jr., former professional ice hockey player
 Joe Cavanagh, attorney and former ice hockey player
 Jimmy Cooney, shortstop in Major League Baseball
 Johnny Cooney, professional baseball player
 Frank Matano, comedian, television personality, YouTuber, and actor
 Tom Mellor, ice hockey defenseman
 Vinny Pazienza, former professional boxer
 Don Reo, television writer and producer
 Mike Stenhouse, former outfielder, first baseman, and designated hitter in Major League Baseball
 Rudolph E. Tanzi, professor of neurology
 Jincy Willett, author and writing teacher

References

External links 
 Cranston High School East official website

Buildings and structures in Cranston, Rhode Island
Schools in Providence County, Rhode Island
Public high schools in Rhode Island